Liga Deportiva Universitaria de Quito's 1990 season was the club's 60th year of existence, the 37th year in professional football and the 30th in the top level of professional football in Ecuador.

Kits
Sponsor(s): Philips

Squad

Competitions

Serie A

First stage

Results

Second stage

Results

Third stage

Liguilla Final

References
RSSSF - 1990 Serie A

External links
Official Site 
LDU Quito (0) - Emelec (4)
LDU Quito (4) - D. Cuenca (1)
LDU Quito (1) - El Nacional (2)
LDU Quito (3) - El Nacional (3)
LDU Quito (3) - Barcelona SC (1)
LDU Quito (3) - Barcelona SC (1)
LDU Quito (3) - Barcelona SC (1)
LIGA DE QUITO - CAMPEON NACIONAL 1990

1990